Stelios Okkarides (born November 15, 1977 in Nicosia, Cyprus) is a retired Cypriot football defender who last played for Doxa Katokopia.

He played mainly for APOEL where he stayed for 7 years. He also played for Apollon, Olympiakos Nicosia and for Doxa Katokopias.

External links
 

Living people
1977 births
Cypriot footballers
Cyprus international footballers
Association football defenders
APOEL FC players
Olympiakos Nicosia players
Apollon Limassol FC players
Doxa Katokopias FC players
Cypriot First Division players
Sportspeople from Nicosia